Bibishki is a rural locality (a village) in Safonovsky District of Smolensk Oblast, Russia, located  southeast of Safonovo and  south of the M1 "Belarus" Highway, on the right bank of the Vopets River. Population: 16 (2007 est.); area:

References

Rural localities in Smolensk Oblast